is a railway station on the AbukumaExpress in  the city of Date, Fukushima Japan.

Lines

Station layout
Tomino Station has two opposed side platforms connected by a level crossing. There is no station building and the station is unattended.

Adjacent stations

History
Tomino Station opened on July 1, 1988.

Passenger statistics
In fiscal 2015, the station was used by an average of 33 passengers daily (boarding passengers only).

Surrounding area
 Abukuma River

See also
 List of Railway Stations in Japan

References

External links

  Abukuma Express home page 

Railway stations in Fukushima Prefecture
Abukuma Express Line
Railway stations in Japan opened in 1988
Date, Fukushima